Grottaminarda is a town and comune in the province of Avellino (Campania), situated  northeast of Naples, in the southwest of Italy. 
  
Grottaminarda is part of Roman Catholic Diocese of Ariano Irpino-Lacedonia and its territory borders with the municipalities of Ariano Irpino, Bonito, Flumeri, Fontanarosa, Frigento, Gesualdo, Melito Irpino and Mirabella Eclano.

Economy
Today, Grottaminarda's  industrial district provides jobs for workers commuting from nearby cities. Many small and medium farms are present as well. The comune is a producer of torrone and salami. A large market, including vendors of fruit, vegetables, cheese, salami and a wide variety of household items is held every Monday.

Main sights

Sights include the churches of Santa Maria Maggiore, San Michele, and some ancient monuments.

Transport
Grottaminarda is served by the A16 motorway Naples-Bari, at the homonym exit. It is crossed in the middle by the state highway SS90.

People
Leopoldo Faretra (1908-2001), physician
Vincenzo Volpe (1855-1929), painter

References

External links

 Official website
Grottaminarda on tuttocitta.it

Cities and towns in Campania